Moring may refer to:
 Bill Moring (born 1958), American jazz bassist
 Ivo Moring (born 1971), German music producer and songwriter
 Karsten Möring (born 1949), German politician
 Marcel Möring (born 1957), Dutch writer

See also
 Crowell & Moring, international law firm headquartered in Washington, D.C.
 Mooring (disambiguation)